Betty Browne was an American screenwriter and stage actress primarily known for writing intertitles for comedy shorts during Hollywood's silent era.

Biography 
Betty was born in New York City to Mr. Browne (who died when she was an infant) and Aimee Fitzgerald. She was the granddaughter of former Supreme Court Justice Edward Browne.

Betty started out her career in entertainment as an actress and a Ziegfeld girl. She married Australian actor and Broadway producer Leslie Casey in New York City in 1918. She later married fellow screenwriter Gene Towne for a time; the pair had a daughter before divorcing.

Selected filmography 

Taxi Spooks (1929)
Baby's Birthday (1929)
Hubby's Weekend Trip (1929)
A Taxi Scandal (1928)
The Bargain Hunt (1928)
Smith's Catalina Rowboat Race (1928)
Motorboat Mamas (1928)
Taxi for Two (1928)
The Chicken (1928)
The Bicycle Flirt (1928)
A Blonde for a Night (1928)
Love at First Flight (1928)
The Girl from Everywhere (1927)

References

External links
 

Ziegfeld girls
American women screenwriters
1900 births
1959 deaths
20th-century American women writers
Writers from New York City
Screenwriters from New York (state)
20th-century American actresses
American stage actresses
20th-century American screenwriters